Cyclodius is a genus of crabs in the family Xanthidae, containing the following species:

Cyclodius drachi (Guinot, 1964)
Cyclodius granulatus (Targioni-Tozzetti, 1877)
Cyclodius granulosus De Man, 1888
Cyclodius maculatus (Stimpson, 1860)
Cyclodius nitidus (Dana, 1852)
Cyclodius obscurus (Hombron & Jacquinot, 1846)
Cyclodius perlatus (Nobili, 1905)
Cyclodius ungulatus (H. Milne-Edwards, 1834)

References

Xanthoidea